The Public Service Association of NSW (PSA) is a union which covers employees in the government, university and related public sector in New South Wales. The union is registered under New South Wales state legislation and is affiliated with the Labor Council of New South Wales.

For constitutional and legal reasons, the union has not fully integrated with the Community and Public Sector Union, which is a national union registered under Commonwealth legislation, of which it is classified as an "Associated Body". Members of the PSA are also members of the CPSU. The Association is also a member of the State Public Service Federation Group of the CPSU.

History 
The first attempt to form the Association was made in April 1886 by Arthur Josling and P.H. Somerville. Their actions may have been prompted by similar moves in Victoria and by growing concerns of political patronage within the service.

The Provisional Committee set up to establish the organisation stated that the Association would not have a political character nor would it be a trade union. Thirteen years passed before the union was established in 1899.

The first edition of the Association's newspaper, The Public Service Journal, appeared on 4 January 1900 and carried the historic story of public servants meeting to consider the union's draft constitution. The Chairman, Mr. Beauer, Clerk of the Peace, in addressing the meeting said,
"... though we have a loyal and faithful service, we must have a fearless service. I mean a service which will not be spineless, or a cringing, craving service, which is always indicative of that which is wrong, because ultimately they would find that a service which dare not express its views in a reasonable and proper manner, and dare not ask for what was legitimately its rights, was bound, more or less, to be a menace to the State."Sydney Morning Herald, Saturday 10 June 1899.

The constitution was then submitted to the Premier, George Reid and the Public Service Board. Both parties approved its contents. The Association's first Chairman was Mr. Cornelius Delohery with Mr. W.A. Thomson elected Secretary.

In October 1900, the first country branch was formed at Moree. Others quickly followed in Armidale, Goulburn, Hay, Newcastle, Forbes and Orange. In November of the same year, Mr. John Osbourne was appointed as the first permanent Secretary and the first Council was elected to conduct the business of the PSA.

In 1908, the industrial arbitration system was established in NSW. The PSA was not only excluded from that system but had its membership of approximately 3,300 fragmented by the creation of other unions such as the railways and teachers.

In 1910, the PSA conducted its first major campaign covering equal pay, superannuation and conditions.

In 1915, it had to be decided whether to register as a trade union under the Industrial Arbitration and Trade Union Acts. The proposal fired spirited debate but a referendum resulted in 670 members supporting registration with 538 votes cast in opposition. The PSA subsequently became registered as a trade union under the Trade Union Act and an industrial union under the Industrial Arbitration Act. Four internal divisions were established - Clerical, General, Professional and Education.

By 1920, a vocational structure was emerging - the division and representation of members by the jobs they did - and the PSA's first awards were lodged.

In 1922, new legislation again excluded the PSA from the arbitration system. In an attempt to correct this situation the PSA waged a major political campaign between 1925 and 1930 to regain access to the system. The Lang Labor Government eventually amended the legislation. Four sections then emerged - Clerical, General, Professional and Government Agencies - plus a Women's Auxiliary.

In July 1927, the Association changed the name of its newspaper from The Public Service Journal to Red Tape.

During the Great Depression years - 1930 to 1945 - the Association fought a rearguard action to protect members and conducted campaigns to maintain jobs. While job losses were minimised, the State Government slashed public servant salaries and raided the monetary resources of the State Superannuation Fund.

It was years before the Association was able to restore pre-depression salaries and was not until 1944 that the State Government repaid the money taken from the Superannuation Fund.

In 1944, the Crown Employees' Appeal Board was established. The creation of the body was one of the PSA's earliest objectives.

Somewhere between 1948 and 1953, the PSA affiliated with the Labor Council of New South Wales, now known as UnionsNSW.

Presidents

Secretaries and General Secretaries

Assistant General Secretaries

Notes

External links

Australian Council of Trade Unions
UnionsNSW
PSA website
Old PSA website
CPSU (SPSF Group) NSW Branch

Trade unions in New South Wales
Trade unions established in 1899
1899 establishments in Australia
Australian Public Sector Trade Unions